Atwood House or Attwood House may refer to:

in the United States
(by state then city)
Attwood-Hopson House, New Edinburg, AR, listed on the NRHP in Arkansas
Barnett-Attwood House, New Edinburg, AR, listed on the NRHP in Arkansas
Ephraim Atwood House, Cambridge, MA, listed on the NRHP in Massachusetts
Charles R. Atwood House, Taunton, MA, listed on the NRHP in Massachusetts
Thomas Atwood House, Wellfleet, MA, listed on the NRHP in Massachusetts
Demarest-Atwood House, Cresskill, NJ, listed on the NRHP in New Jersey
E. K. Atwood House, Ennis, TX, listed on the NRHP in Texas
Matthews-Atwood House, Ennis, TX, listed on the NRHP in Texas